Matthew Causey (born 1953) is an American academic, film and theatre maker, singer-songwriter and actor. He is associate professor at Trinity College, Dublin and director of the Arts Technology Research Laboratory in the School of Drama, Film and Music. He received his PhD in Drama from Stanford University, where he wrote, produced, and performed in his trilogy of plays, The History of the Avant-Garde (Kill the Dog, 1991; The Laboratory of Hallucinations, 1992; Death, 1993).<ref>Chuang, Angie (13 May 1993). "Director Matthew Causey at it again with his latest avant-garde production,'Death'". The Stanford Daily, Volume 203, Issue 64. Retrieved 6 December 2015.</ref>

He made his film debut as Pondo Sinatra in the 1984 cult comedy The Party Animal.

Publications
Causey, M. Theatre and Performance in Digital Culture: from simulation to embeddedness (Routledge, 2006) 
Causey, M., Meehan, Emma, O'Dwyer, Neill,  The Performing Subject in the Space of Technology: through the virtual toward the real'' (Palgrave, 2005)

References

External links

1953 births
Living people